Baseline Road (Ottawa Road #16) is a road in Ottawa, Ontario, Canada.

Baseline runs from Richmond Road (almost directly over Highway 416) east in a straight line until it ends at the Heron Road Bridge over the Rideau River and Rideau Canal when it becomes Heron Road. Before the 2001 City of Ottawa amalgamation, Baseline formed the border of the city of Ottawa and Nepean. The street is named for its location as the baseline for Nepean Township. When Nepean Township was surveyed, Baseline formed the northern boundary of Nepean's six north–south concessions. Currently, Baseline is a major east–west street, and in the late 1990s it became so busy that Hunt Club Road had to be extended west of the Rideau River to alleviate pressure.

Points of interest on Baseline include the Queensway Carleton Hospital, the Boy Scouts Museum, Algonquin College and the Central Experimental Farm.

Baseline Road is a four-lane principal arterial road for its entire length, except between Centrepointe Drive and Navaho Drive, where it is a five-lane/six-lane arterial (three eastbound lanes and three westbound lanes – a bus lane is present from Constellation west to Centrepointe in lieu of the third westbound lane).

Ramsayville Road in southeast Ottawa used to be called Base Line Road before 2003. The name had to be changed when the former city of Gloucester amalgamated with the city of Ottawa, to avoid confusion.

In the future, Baseline Road will have bus lanes between Navaho Drive and Prince of Wales Drive to speed up transit service in this stretch (OC Transpo bus route 88) due to consistent heavy traffic.

Major intersections
  (Richmond Road / Robertson Road) & 
  Cedarview Road
 Valley Stream Drive & John Sutherland Drive (the latter provides access to Queensway Carleton Hospital)
 Sandcastle Drive
 Monterey Drive
 Morrison Avenue
 Guthrie Street
  Greenbank Road
 Centrepointe Drive & Cobden Road
 Centrepointe Drive & Highgate Road
  Woodroffe Avenue
 Navaho Drive
  Clyde Avenue
  Merivale Road
  Fisher Avenue
  Prince of Wales Drive (east of Prince of Wales,  Baseline Road becomes  Heron Road)

External links

Google Maps: Baseline Rd

Roads in Ottawa